The France national youth handball team is the national under-18 handball team of France that represents France in international matches. It is managed by the French Handball Federation, an affiliate of the International Handball Federation (IHF) and a member of the European Handball Federation (EHF).

Statistics

Youth Olympic Games 

 Champions   Runners up   Third place   Fourth place

World Championship record
 Champions   Runners up   Third place   Fourth place

EHF European Youth Championship 
 Champions   Runners up   Third place   Fourth place

References

External links
World Men's Youth Championship table
European Men's Youth Championship table

Handball in France
Men's national youth handball teams
Handball